Christiaan Goetz (15 February 1883 – 30 November 1911) was a South African cricketer. He played in four first-class matches for Eastern Province in 1906/07.

See also
 List of Eastern Province representative cricketers

References

External links
 

1883 births
1911 deaths
South African cricketers
Eastern Province cricketers
People from Potchefstroom